Storms is a Dutch and German patronymic surname and may refer to:

 Albert Boynton Storms (1860–1933), American professor, university administrator, and Methodist theologian
 Charlie Storms (1820/21?-1881), professional gunfighter and gambler of the American Old West
 Émile Storms (1846-1918), Belgian soldier and explorer
 Godfrid Storms (1911–2003), Dutch medievalist
 Harrison Storms (1915–1992), American aeronautical engineer
 Henry Storms (ca. 1795–1874), American merchant and politician
 Justin Storms (born 1981), American artist and musician
 Kirsten Storms (born 1984), American actress
 Peter Storms, Master Commandant of the USS Peacock (1813)
 Réginald Storms (1880-1948), Belgian sport shooter who competed in the 1908 Summer Olympics
 Ronda Storms (born 1965), American politician from Florida
 Sam Storms (born 1951), American Calvinist, charismatic theologian, pastor and author
 Tim Storms (born 1972), American singer and composer
 Waneta Storms (born 1968), Canadian dramatic actor

Fictional 
 Serge A. Storms, the main fictional character in most of Tim Dorsey's novels

See also
 Storm (surname)
 Storm (given name)
 Storm (disambiguation)

Patronymic surnames
Dutch-language surnames
Surnames from nicknames